Muri may refer to:

Places

Colombia
 Río Murri, a tributary of the Atrato River

Estonia
 Muri, Viljandi County, village in Karksi Parish, Viljandi County
 Muri, Tartu County, village in Luunja Parish, Tartu County

India
 Muri, Ranchi, a town in Jharkhand
 Muri Junction railway station

Iran
 Muri, Khuzestan, a village in Khuzestan Province
 Muri-ye Ajam, a village in Kohgiluyeh and Boyer-Ahmad Province
 Muri, Razavi Khorasan, a village in Razavi Khorasan Province

Japan
 Muri Dam, on the island of Hokkaido

New Zealand
 Muri railway station, a former railway station in Pukerua Bay
 Muri Beach, a beach by the lagoon on Rarotonga in the Cook Islands

Nigeria
 Muri, Nigeria, a town and emirate in Taraba State

Switzerland
 Muri, Aargau, a municipality in the canton of Aargau
 Muri District, a district of the canton of Aargau
 Muri Abbey, a Benedictine monastery
 Muri bei Bern, a municipality in the canton of Bern

People with the name
 Muri (singer), real name Murad Mahmoud, part of the Danish pop duo Muri & Mario
 Apia Muri, Papua New Guinean basketball player
 André Muri (born 1981), Norwegian footballer
 Bjørn Johan Muri (born 1990), Norwegian singer
 Dick Muri (born 1953), U.S. politician
 Enikő Muri (born 1990), Hungarian actress and singer
 James Muri (1918–2013), American World War II pilot
 Linda Muri (born 1963), American rower

Other uses
 Muri (Japanese term), a word for overburden used in the Toyota Production System
 Muri (food), puffed rice in South Asian cuisine
 Muri or Moori, a Dragon Ball character
 MURI (grant), Multidisciplinary University Research Initiative
 Muri language, an alternative name for two unrelated Papuan languages:
 Mer language, spoken in the Bird's Neck, Indonesian Papua
 Guhu-Samane language, spoken in the Bird's Tail Peninsula, Papua New Guinea
 Muri Express, an Indian express train
 University of Muri, a fictional university

See also 
 Mury (disambiguation)
 Murri (disambiguation)
 Murie (disambiguation)
 Murry (disambiguation)